Robert Peirce may refer to:

 Robert B. F. Peirce (1843–1898), U.S. Representative from Indiana
 Robert Peirce (engineer) (1863–1933), British-born civil engineer in Malaysia and Singapore
 Bob Peirce (born 1955), British businessman and diplomat
 Robert Peirce III (born 1970), attorney at Robert Peirce and Associates

See also
Robert Pierce (disambiguation)
Robert Pearce (disambiguation)